Anzacs (named for members of the all volunteer army formations) is a 1985 Australian five-part television miniseries set in World War I. The series follows the lives of a group of young Australian men who enlist in the 8th Battalion (Australia) of the First Australian Imperial Force in 1914, fighting first at Gallipoli in 1915, and then on the Western Front for the remainder of the war.

It follows in the wake of Australian New Wave war films such as Breaker Morant (1980), Gallipoli (1981), and precedes The Lighthorsemen (1987). Recurring themes of these films include the Australian identity, such as mateship and larrikinism, the loss of innocence in war, and also the continued coming of age of the Australian nation and its soldiers (the ANZAC spirit).

Episodes

Cast

Main

 Andrew Clarke as Martin Barrington
 Jon Blake as Robert Flanagan
 Paul Hogan as Pat Cleary
 Christopher Cummins as Roly Collins
 Jonathan Sweet as Bill Harris
 Megan Williams as Kate Baker
 Shane Briant as "Kaiser" Schmidt
 Alec Wilson as "Pudden" Parsons
 Peter Finlay as "Bluey"
 Bill Kerr as General Monash

Supporting
 Tony Bonner as Harold Armstrong
 David Lynch as Max Earnshaw
 Ilona Rodgers as Lady Thea Barrington
 Elaine Lee as Madame
 Robert Coleby as Reverend Lonsdale
 Peter Browne as Carter

Additional
 David Bradshaw as Keith Murdoch
 Mark Hembrow as Dick Baker
 Jim Holt as Dinny "Dingo" Gordon
 Patrick Ward as Tom McArthur
 Edmund Pegge as Captain Young
 Wayne Jarratt as Private Upton
 Karl Hansen as Erik Johansen
 Tony Cornwill as Karl Johansen
 Terry Brittingham as Private Morrissey
 James Wright as 'Edward Kelly'
 Vincent Ball as Rupert Barrington
 Sheila Kennelly as Mrs Baker
 Howard Bell as Cyril Earnshaw
 Diana Greentree as Mrs Collins
 Leah Steventon as Marie

 Vivean Gray as Matron
 Mark Mitchell as a dying German soldier
 Bruce Kerr as Lancashire Colonel
 Gareth Wilding-Forbes as Buffs Officer
 Chris Gregory as German Sergeant
 Noel Trevarthen as Douglas Haig, 1st Earl Haig
 Michael Adams as General Kiggell
 Rhys McConnochie as Lloyd George
 Malcolm Robertson as General Bridges
 Sean Myers as Lt General Walker
 Reg Evans as General Birdwood
 Chris Waters as General White
 Francis Bell as Major-General Elliott
 Geoff Parry as General Blamey

Production
The series was produced by Geoff Burrowes for Nine Network, Australia. The episodes were directed by Pino Amenta, John Dixon, or George Miller (of The Man from Snowy River fame). The story consultant was Patsy Adam-Smith and the filming took place over 20 weeks.

The actors playing British officers and politicians were almost all New Zealanders. Many of the extras playing the roles of Allied, American, and German soldiers were serving members of the Australian Army. This was done to keep costs down so that actors did not have to learn how to act as soldiers or to have to teach them how to use the weapons. Many of the actors would also appear on the US TV series Mission Impossible which was filmed mostly in Australia.

In one episode, an Australian soldier remarks how much the French countryside reminds him of Daylesford back home in Victoria, Australia. This was an in-joke as some scenes were filmed near Daylesford, including the German counter-attack scene in episode 4.

Music
Australian composer Bruce Rowland composed the original music for the series which also popularised many old marching songs of the period. The classic Australian song 'Waltzing Matilda' is heard at several points as is 'It's a Long Way to Tipperary'. Several songs from the satirical musical 'Oh, What a Lovely War!' were also used, including the title song, 'I wore a tunic', 'The bells of Hell' and other period numbers, like 'If you were the only girl' and 'keep the home fires burning' – which were performed by various actors.

A 45-minute cassette tape of the soundtrack, entitled ANZACS : original soundtrack from the television mini series, was released in 1985.

Reception
Well noted for its humour and historical accuracy, the series was "a huge rating success for the Nine Network when it aired". According to the review by James Anthony: "The battle scenes are terrific and the muddy trenches of the Western Front look acceptably cold and horrible. [Then again] Some of the acting goes a bit astray and there is sometimes a bit too much play on larrikinism and ockerness, but overall it sits well as a quality drama with good characters." In the 2003 book German Anzacs and the First World War by John F. Williams, even more contextual detail is provided: "'Anzacs' is essentially a very long buddy movie in the form of television soap. While much care, research and funding obviously went into making the battle scenes and historical ambience as realistic as possible, the characters are two dimensional and clichéd. Even so, on occasion 'Anzacs' does offer insights that are unexpected and subtle"

International release 
The series was first aired in the UK on 12–16 January 1987 during weekday afternoons.

It was also repeated on Sunday evenings during June and July 1987 on BBC1 in primetime.

Media

The complete series was released on VHS in the late 1990s in Australia. A 3-disc set of DVDs is available. The DVD breaks down the content of the episodes as follows:
The Great Adventure – Australia in 1914; Outbreak of war; Recruitment; Training; Gallipoli: Landing/stalemate/withdrawal. [96:43] 
The Big Push – Arrival in France (1916); Nursery Sector; The Battle of the Somme; Pozières. [96:36] 
The Devils Arithmetic – The Somme Winter (1916–17); The Hindenburg Line; Bullecourt; Blighty Leave; Third Battle of Ypres begins (July 1917); Menin Road; Broodseinde Ridge. [97:08] 
Fields of Fire – Third Battle of Ypres bogs down (November 1917); The German Offensive (March 1918); The Battle of Amiens; Hazebrouk; Battle of Nieppe Forest. [94:52] 
Now There was a Day – The Yanks are coming; "peaceful penetration"; Monash appointed Commander of the 5 Australian Divisions; Battle of Hamel; The "Jack ups" Monash's Big Push (8 August 1918)... Armistice (11 November 1918); Back Home. [95:08]

The total running time is 513 minutes (episodes plus bonus material), or 520 mins (episodes plus bonus material) for Region 2, and rated "M". The DVD also includes a featurette – Making Of: History in the Making – The Making of Anzacs. This was narrated by well known Australian actor Charles "Bud" Tingwell who had served in the Royal Australian Air Force during World War II and included interviews (from the time of filming) with Geoff Burrowes and John Dixon as well as the actors who appeared in the series.

A condensed movie-length version, cut down to two hours and 45 minutes from the original eight, was released on VHS in the United States. The series has yet to be released on DVD in other regions. A Region 2 3-disc DVD set is now available from Source1 Media in the Netherlands. While the box set has Dutch text on the back on the cover and optional Dutch subtitles on the discs it does provide a viable option for British or other English speaking viewers in Europe.

See also
 ANZAC Girls

References

External links

Napoleonic Guide – ANZACs

History in the Media: Film and Television

1980s Australian television miniseries
Australian drama television series
World War I television drama series
1985 Australian television series debuts
1985 Australian television series endings
ANZAC (Australia)
Films about the Gallipoli campaign
Cultural depictions of Douglas Haig, 1st Earl Haig
Cultural depictions of David Lloyd George
Films directed by George T. Miller